The 2022 America East Men's Basketball Conference tournament was the postseason men's basketball tournament for the America East Conference that began on March 6, 2022 and ended on March 12, 2022. All tournament games were played on the home arenas of the higher-seeded school. The winner, Vermont, received the conference's automatic bid to the NCAA tournament.

Seeds 
Eight of the ten America East teams qualified for the tournament. Stony Brook was not eligible for the tournament due to a postseason ban imposed by the conference. The teams were seeded by record in conference, with a tiebreaker system to seed teams with identical conference records.

Schedule

Bracket

See also 

 2022 America East women's basketball tournament
 America East Conference men's basketball tournament

References 

Tournament
America East Conference men's basketball tournament
America East men's basketball tournament
2022 in sports in Vermont
Sports competitions in Burlington, Vermont
College basketball tournaments in Vermont